Thomas Doyle (born 16 January 1993) is an Irish hurler who plays as a full-back for the Westmeath senior team. He is the current captain of the team.

Doyle made his debut on the inter-county scene at the age of seventeen when he was selected for the Westmeath minor team. He played for two championship seasons with the minor team, before joining the Westmeath under-21 team. By this stage he had also joined the Westmeath senior team when he was added to the extended panel for the 2012 Walsh Cup. Since then he has become a regular member of the starting fifteen and has won one National League Division 2A medal.

Honours

Westmeath

 All Ireland Minor B Hurling Championship (1): 2010
 National Hurling League Division 2A (2): 2016, 2019
 Kehoe Cup (1): 2019

References

1993 births
Living people
Lough Lene Gaels hurlers
Westmeath inter-county hurlers